Grondona may refer to:

People
 Gustavo Grondona, Argentine football midfielder
 Humberto Grondona, Argentine association football coach
 Jaime Grondona, Chilean footballer 
 Julio Grondona, Argentine football executive
 Mariano Grondona, Argentine journalist 
 Stefano Grondona, Italian guitarist
 Santiago Grondona Argentine rugby union player

Places
 Grondona, Piedmont, a comune (municipality) in the Province of Alessandria, Italy